In Japanese traditional beliefs and literature,  are a type of ghost believed to be capable of causing harm in the world of the living, injuring or killing enemies, or even causing natural disasters to exact vengeance to "redress" the wrongs it received while alive, then taking their spirits from their dying bodies.  are often depicted as wronged women, who are traumatized by what happened during life and exact revenge in death.

Emperor Sutoku, Taira no Masakado, and Sugawara no Michizane are called the  because they are considered to be the most powerful and revered  in Japanese history.

 are used as subjects in various traditional Japanese performing arts such as Noh, Kabuki, and Rakugo; for example,  is a Noh mask representing a female .

The Japanese people's reverence for  has been passed down to the present day. , located between skyscrapers near Tokyo Station, was to be moved several times as part of urban redevelopment projects, but each move resulted in the death of a construction worker and a series of accidents. Although the buildings surrounding the Taira no Masakado mound have been rebuilt many times, the mound has remained intact between the high-rise buildings. Even today, the mound is carefully maintained.

Origin
The earliest  cult that developed was around Prince Nagaya who died in 729; and the first record of possession by the  spirit affecting health is found in the chronicle  (797), which states that "'s soul harmed Genbō to death" (Hirotsugu having died in a failed insurrection, named the "Fujiwara no Hirotsugu Rebellion", after failing to remove his rival, the priest Genbō, from power).

Vengeance
According to the belief of Ikiryō, a person's soul or spirit exists naturally when it is stable or in balance. This can allegedly also occur in individuals who died an untimely death.

Traditionally in Japan,  driven by vengeance were thought capable of causing not only their enemy's death, as in the case of Hirotsugu's vengeful spirit held responsible for killing the priest Genbō, but causing natural disasters such as earthquakes, fires, storms, drought, famine and pestilence, as in the case of Prince Sawara's spirit embittered against his brother, the Emperor Kanmu. In common parlance, such vengeance exacted by supernatural beings or forces is termed .

The Emperor Kanmu had accused his brother Sawara, possibly falsely, of plotting to remove him from the throne. Sawara was then exiled, and died by fasting. According to a number of scholars, the reason that the Emperor moved the capital to Nagaoka-kyō thence to Kyoto was an attempt to avoid the wrath of his brother's spirit, according to a number of scholars. This not succeeding entirely, the emperor tried to lift the curse by appeasing his brother's ghost, by performing Buddhist rites to pay respect, and granting Prince Sawara the posthumous title of emperor.

A well-known example of appeasement of the  spirit is the case of Sugawara no Michizane, who had been politically disgraced and died in exile. It was believed to cause the death of his calumniators in quick succession, as well as catastrophes (especially lightning damage), and the court tried to appease the wrathful spirit by restoring Michizane's old rank and position. Michizane became deified in the cult of the Tenjin, with Tenman-gū shrines erected around him.

Examples
In this story the husband remains unharmed; however, he is the target of the 's vengeance. Oiwa's vengeance on him is not physical retribution, but rather psychological torment.

Other examples include:

 How a Man's Wife Became a Vengeful Ghost and How Her Malignity Was Diverted by a Master of Divination
 In this tale from the medieval collection , an abandoned wife is found dead with a full head of hair intact and her bones still attached. The husband, fearing retribution from her spirit, asks a diviner for aid. The husband must endure while grabbing her hair and riding astride her corpse. She complains of the heavy load and leaves the house to "go looking" (presumably for her husband), but after a day she gives up and returns, after which the diviner is able to complete her exorcism with an incantation.
 Of a Promise Broken
 In this tale from the Izumo area recorded by Lafcadio Hearn, a samurai vows to his dying wife never to remarry. He soon breaks this promise, and the ghost of the deceased wife murders her husbands new young bride, ripping her head off. A watchman chases down the apparition, and while slashing his sword recites a Buddhist prayer, destroying the ghost of the dead wife.

In media

The  is a staple of the J-Horror genre, most notable being Sadako Yamamura and Kayako Saeki from the Ring and Ju-On franchises, respectively.

In The Ring Sadako Yamamura is the main antagonist. Her origin is from the Ring novel series by Koji Suzuki, where she haunts and kills people through tapes on a TV. Before her death she is raped by a doctor with smallpox, who seals her in a well where she dies.

The aforementioned  has been made into numerous movies and retold many times over the course of Japanese history. The story revolves around Tamiya Iemon and his wife Oiwa. Their relationship is not a happy one, and through some set of circumstances Iemon gives Oiwa a powder that permanently disfigures her face. Upon realizing this Oiwa takes her own life and that of her baby.

 is another Japanese ghost story that has been retold many ways. In this story Okiku, a beautiful maid, is the target of desire for the samurai whose house she works at, Aoyama Tessan. She continually refuses his advances, and in a fit of rage Tessan hides one of 10 expensive plates that Okiku is in charge of counting. When Okiku cannot find the 10th plate she recounts them obsessively, panicking more each time. Tessan tells her he will forgive her losing the plate if she becomes his mistress, but even then she refuses him. At her refusal Tessan throws her into a well on the property, where she dies. After this, every night Okiku rises from the well, softly counting to 9, and then letting out a horrendous shriek once she reaches 10.

, from the third entry of the fighting game Killer Instinct, is an  who died while defending her village. She still haunts her old village and will take vengeance on anyone who desecrates its ruins with her . She has pale white skin and long black hair like most .

In 2018, the asymmetrical horror game Dead by Daylight released the Shattered Bloodline chapter DLC, and with it came Rin Yamaoka, The Spirit. The Spirit is an  who returns from the dead after being brutally murdered by her father. In March 2022, Sadako Yamamura was added as a playable character.

The term  is also present in the game Phasmophobia. It is one of 24 ghost types that the player can identify, and is noted for treating lit candles like a crucifix.

Physical appearance
Traditionally,  and other  (ghosts) had no particular appearance. However, with the rising of popularity of kabuki during the Edo period, a specific costume was developed.

Highly visual in nature, and with a single actor often assuming various roles within a play, kabuki developed a system of visual shorthand that allowed the audience to instantly clue in as to which character is on stage, as well as emphasize the emotions and expressions of the actor.

A ghost costume consisted of three main elements:
This garment was also worn during .
Wild, unkempt long black hair

See also
 
 Eidolon
 Fatal Frame (video game)
 List of supernatural beings in Chinese folklore
 Ghosts in Vietnamese culture
 Japanese urban legends
 Kayako Saeki
 List of ghosts
 Muoi: The Legend of a Portrait (film)
 S-Ko
 Hisako
 Sadako Yamamura
 Taira no Masakado
 Vengeful ghost
 Madam Koi Koieee

Notes

Citations

Bibliography
Iwasaka, Michiko and Toelken, Barre.  Ghosts and the Japanese: Cultural Experiences in Japanese Death Legends, Utah State University Press, 1994.

External links
Ghoul Power - Onryou in the Movies Japanzine by Jon Wilks
Yūrei-ga gallery at Zenshoan Temple

Japanese ghosts
Undead
Japanese folklore

Mythological monsters
Supernatural legends
Goryō faith